SIAC is an acronym used by several bodies:
Securities Industry Automation Corporation
Singapore International Arbitration Centre
Sistema Integrado de Artilleria de Campaña, General Dynamics Santa Bárbara Sistemas
Sociedad Interamericana de Astronomía en la Cultura
Southern Indiana Athletic Conference, a high school athletic conference
Southern Intercollegiate Athletic Conference, an NCAA Division II collegiate athletic conference
Special Immigration Appeals Commission
State Institute for Administrative Career, Mumbai, see Government Colleges Hostel, Mumbai
Southern Irish Asphalt Company SIAC Construction